Haskins Hobson (April 2, 1877 – February 10, 1954) was an American attorney and politician who served in the Virginia House of Delegates.

References

External links 

1877 births
1954 deaths
Democratic Party members of the Virginia House of Delegates
20th-century American politicians
People from Powhatan County, Virginia